Within chaos magic, a servitor is a psychological complex, deliberately created by the magician for a specific purpose to operate autonomously from the magician's consciousness.

Concept
A servitor is an entity "specifically created by the magician to perform a set range of tasks". Phil Hine writes that servitors are created "by deliberately budding off portions of our psyche and identifying them by means of a name, trait, symbol", after which "we can come to work with them (and understand how they affect us) at a conscious level."

Servitors can be created to perform a wide range of tasks, from the specific to the general, and may be considered as expert systems which are able to modify themselves to take into account new factors that are likely to arise whilst they are performing their tasks. They can be programmed to work within specific circumstances, or to be operating continually.

Servitors form part of a thoughtform continuum: from sigils, to servitors, to egregores, to godforms. At the start of the continuum are "dumb, unintelligent sigils", which represent a particular desire or intention. When a complex of thoughts, desires and intentions gains such a level of sophistication that it appears to operate autonomously from the magician's consciousness, as if it were an independent being, then such a complex is referred to as a servitor. When such a being becomes large enough that it exists independently of any one individual, as a form of "group mind", then it is referred to as an egregore.

Alternatively, a magician may choose to create servitors from negative aspects of their psyche, such as "habits, shortcomings, faults, revulsions", rather than positive desires or intentions. In doing so, they can interact with those traits as personal demons, and bind or banish them to eradicate them from the psyche.

History 
Austin Osman Spare stated that psychological complexes could be deliberately created through his sigil technique, referring to sigils as "sentient symbols". According to Spare, feeding sigils with free belief incubates "obsessions", which in turn gives rise to complexes.

Peter J. Carroll writes: "These beings have a legion of names drawn from the demonology of many cultures: elementals, familiars, incubi, succubi, bud-wills, demons, atavisms, wraiths, spirits, and so on." Hine, in turn, compares the servitor to the Tibetan Buddhist concept of the tulpa.

See also

References

Further reading
 

Chaos magic